Asanterabi Malima (born 30 September 1979) is a Tanzanian researcher.

Early life and education
Malima was born in Dar es Salaam. He was educated at Azania Secondary and Aga Khan High schools.

Personal life
He is the son of former Tanzanian Finance Minister Kighoma Malima and the brother of the incumbent Deputy Finance Minister Adam Malima.

References

External links

 

1979 births
Living people
Tanzanian scientists
Azania Secondary School alumni
Aga Khan Mzizima Secondary School alumni
Northeastern University alumni